Tailcoat for Scapegrace is a 1979 Soviet romantic comedy directed by Eldor Urazbaev, with script by Arkadi Krasilschikov.

Plot 
A random event brought two completely different people together: a schoolboy Zhenya Grachev and a former locksmith who is now a crane driver - Zhora Myakishev. The boy escaped from the camp to see his brother who is serving in the army. Myakishev stole a car with a watering depot to arrange rain for filmmakers who rented him a dress suit.

Both are hiding from the police, but by inadvertence, Myakishev specifically is entrusted with accompanying the caught boy to the city. When they get to know each other closer these very different people become good friends.

The tailcoat which was obtained with difficulty, must transform George Myakishev into a gentleman. During the televised TV finals of the competitive ballroom dancing he can finally prove to the girl he likes that he is not such a scapegrace as everyone thinks he is.

Cast 

 Mikhail Yegorov as Yevgeny Grachyov 
 Viktor Ilichyov as Georgy Myakishev
 Leonid Kuravlyov as the police captain Deev
  Alexander Lebedev  as police sergeant
 Artyom Karapetyan as Vasily Petrovich Gromoboev
 Tatyana Tashkova as Light
 Antonina Bogdanova as Mary M., Grandma Amy
 Elizaveta Nikischihina as Vovik's mother
 Nikolai Parfyonov as the guard in couture
  Vladimir Tikhonov  asKondakov's friend Amy
  Vladimir Gerasimov  as policeman
 Natalia Kaznacheyeva as Pioneer Khokhlakova
 Nikholay Pogodin as Taxi Drivercargo
 Maxim Puchkov as a pioneer of the third squad
  Yevgeny Gurov  as passenger in train

Crew 
 Written by: Arkady Krasilshchikov
 Director: Eldor Urazbayev
 Director of Photography: Vladimir Archangel
 Composer: Edward Hagagortyan
 Art Director: Halina Anfilova
 Director: A. Becker
 Operator: E. Tafel
 Sound: AP Drozdov
 Conductor: M. Nersesian
 Costume designer: O. Kochetov
 Makeup artist: C. Kupershmidt
 Installation: I. Dorofeev
 Editor: V. Kibalnikova
 Combination of shooting:
 Operator: Yu Ivanov
 Artist: VA Rebrov
 Choreography: G. Gorohovnikov
 Director: A. Kravetsky

External links

 Information on the film database site ru / «Cinema Theatre. RU "

1979 films
Films directed by Eldor Urazbayev
Soviet romantic comedy films
1979 romantic comedy films
Gorky Film Studio films